Pea Ridge High School is a comprehensive public high school located in the fringe town of Pea Ridge, Arkansas, United States. The school provides secondary education for students in grades kindergarten through 12. It is one of nine public high schools in Benton County, Arkansas and the sole high school administered by the Pea Ridge School District.

Academics 
Pea Ridge High School is accredited by the Arkansas Department of Education (ADE) and has been accredited by AdvancED since 1997. The assumed course of study follows the Smart Core curriculum developed by the ADE, which requires students complete at least 22 units prior to graduation. Students complete regular coursework and exams and may take Advanced Placement (AP) courses and exam with the opportunity to receive college credit. Additionally, Pea Ridge offers articulated college credit with Northwest Arkansas Community College (NWACC) and Northwest Technical Institute (NTI) through vocational programs.

Athletics 
The Pea Ridge High School mascot and athletic emblem is the Blackhawks with red, black and white serving as the school colors.

The Pea Ridge Blackhawks compete in interscholastic activities within the 4A Classification via the 4A Region 1 Conference, as administered by the Arkansas Activities Association. The Blackhawks field teams in football, cross country (boys/girls), basketball (boys/girls), track and field (boys/girls), baseball, softball, and cheer.
State Titles include:
Baseball: 1985
Golf: 2007 (Justin Doherty)
Cross Country: 1989
Cheerleading: 2011, 2013, 2014, 2015

References

External links 
 

1880 establishments in Arkansas
Educational institutions established in 1880
Public high schools in Arkansas
Schools in Benton County, Arkansas
Pea Ridge, Arkansas